Ascent Solar Technologies, Inc. is a publicly traded photovoltaic (PV) company located in Thornton, Colorado. Its primary product is a flexible CIGS solar cell on a plastic substrate.

Technology 
Ascent Solar's thin-film solar modules are manufactured from CIGS cells using copper indium gallium (di)selenide semiconductor (CIGS), which has shown a 10.5% NREL efficiency in real-world conditions. What makes this proprietary technology unique, however, is its relative size, weight and flexibility: Ascent's CIGS panels currently allow for 85 watts/meter, and 48 watts/kg, thereby giving them the greatest power density and weight ratio among available flexible photovoltaic products by a significant margin. This allows for the efficient use of solar power in a range of new contexts, in which size or weight restrictions have previously rendered solar power impracticable: e.g., cell phones, airplanes, unmanned vehicles, consumer electronics, railways, space programs, and off-grid applications. This developing technology was selected as one of the "100 Most Innovative Technologies for 2010" by R&D Magazine, and as one of the "50 Best Inventions of 2011" by Time magazine.

Market history 
Ascent Solar entered the manufacturing stage for its products in 2013, in part by teaming up with a range of other companies like TFG Radiant (for integrating these materials into a range of building and construction materials), Foxconn (for a "pilot project" at the Zhengzhou factory, which was then manufacturing the iPhone 5), and Bye Aerospace (for solar-powered unmanned aircraft).

It also launched the EnerPlex brand in 2013. EnerPlex represents the consumer side of Ascent Solar.

EnerPlex 
EnerPlex is a brand of solar and electronic consumer products launched by Ascent Solar, Inc. Unlike traditional glass backed panels, the panels integrated into all EnerPlex products are monolithically integrated on plastic (not glass) substrate.

Corporate history 
Ascent Solar was founded in 2005 by ITN Energy Systems, a company engaged in commercializing emerging energy technologies through spin-offs and joint ventures. During the first few years of operation, its primary focus was developing CIGS thin-film technology and efficient methods of manufacturing it.

On July 18, 2006, Ascent completed its IPO, releasing 3,000,000 shares at $5.50 per share. In June 2007, Norsk Hydro ASA, a Norwegian based supplier of aluminum products, entered into a deal with Ascent whereby it purchased 23% of Ascent shares with the option to increase that stake to up to 35%, which it did on October 7, 2008. On September 22, 2008, Ascent's then CEO, Matthew Foster, stepped down from his position. His reason for doing so was cited as an agreement between him and the company as the company changed from research-driven to production-driven. He will remain with Ascent as a consultant for an additional year after his retirement date. On March 11, 2009, Ascent Solar commenced regular production at their facility in Colorado. The company began with a one-shift production schedule. In September 2022, the company announced Jeffery Max as new CEO

See also 

List of CIGS companies

References

External links 
 
 "Ascent Solar touts flexible CIGS-based PV laminate" 

Technology companies of the United States
Solar energy companies of the United States
Thin-film cell manufacturers
Companies formerly listed on the Nasdaq
2005 establishments in Colorado
Thornton, Colorado
Companies traded over-the-counter in the United States
2006 initial public offerings